Lipová is a municipality and village in Prostějov District in the Olomouc Region of the Czech Republic. It has about 700 inhabitants.

Administrative parts
Villages of Hrochov and Seč are administrative parts of Lipová.

Etymology
The name is derived from lipový les, i.e. "linden forest".

History
The first written mention of Lipová is from 1379. Until 1960, Lipová, Hrochov and Seč were three separate municipalities. In 1961, they were merged.

References

External links

Villages in Prostějov District